The Cross of Changes is the second studio album by the German musical project Enigma, headed by Romanian-German musician and producer Michael Cretu, released on 6 December 1993 by Virgin Records internationally and by Charisma Records in the United States.

Following the worldwide commercial success of the first Enigma album, MCMXC a.D. (1990), Cretu began to write and record music for a new album at A.R.T. Studios, his home studio in Ibiza, Spain. Cretu sampled songs from several artists, including Vangelis, U2, Genesis and Black Sabbath.

The Cross of Changes was a commercial success. Upon its release, it debuted at  1 on the UK Albums Chart, becoming Enigma's second consecutive number-one album in the United Kingdom, and peaked at number nine on the Billboard 200 in the United States, where it sold over two million copies. In 1994, four singles were released from the album: "Return to Innocence", "The Eyes of Truth", "Age of Loneliness (Carly's Song)" (originally written for the film Sliver), and "Out from the Deep". A special limited edition of the album was released on 21 November 1994 on a 24-carat gold-plated disc, containing three additional remixes.

Track listing

Personnel
Credits adapted from the liner notes of The Cross of Changes.

 Andreas Harde (credited as Angel) – additional voice
 Sandra Cretu – additional voice
 Michael Cretu (credited as Curly M.C.) – additional voice, instruments, programming, production, engineering
 Louisa Stanley – additional voice
 Jens Gad – guitars
 Peter Cornelius – guitars

Charts

Weekly charts

Year-end charts

Certifications and sales

References

External links
 Short article about the album
 Details of its release in different countries
 Lyrics to the songs in this album

1993 albums
Albums produced by Michael Cretu
Charisma Records albums
Enigma (German band) albums
Virgin Records albums